Kipleigh Brown is an American actress and photographic artist.

In addition to her film credits, which include the lead role in James Kerwin's sci-fi noir film Yesterday Was a Lie, she is also known for playing Jane Taylor on the television series Star Trek: Enterprise and for sketch comedy at the iO West in Los Angeles.

In 2014, Brown played the part of Barbara Smith in the fan-produced Star Trek Continues episode "Fairest of Them All". Later that year, it was announced she would continue as a recurring character in the series.

In 2015, Brown began regular appearances as "Kuumaarke" in Star Trek Online.

Filmography 
Design (2002) - Heather
Star Trek: Enterprise episode "The Forgotten" (2004) - Crewman 2nd Class Jane Taylor
The Suite Life of Zack & Cody episode "Rumors" (2005) - TV Reporter
Relative Strangers (2006) - Big Guy's Girl
Yesterday Was a Lie (2009) - Hoyle
R.U.R.: Genesis (2013) - Fabry
Star Trek Continues (2014-2017) - Lt. junior grade Barbara Smith
Star Trek Online (2015-2022) - Kuumaarke (voice)

Awards 
"Best Fantasy Actress" (2008) - ShockerFest International Film Festival
"Hot Leading Lady" (2009) - Film Fetish Magazine

References

External links 
 
 
 
 Kipleigh Brown interview at Dork Forest

Year of birth missing (living people)
Living people
American women comedians
American film actresses
American television actresses
American photographers
21st-century American women